John Flaherty (born 4 August 1942) is a New Zealand former cricketer. He played nine first-class matches for Otago between 1964 and 1969.

See also
 List of Otago representative cricketers

References

External links
 

1942 births
Living people
New Zealand cricketers
Otago cricketers
Cricketers from Dunedin